This is a summary of the electoral history of Iain Duncan Smith, a British Conservative Party politician who is currently the Secretary of State for Work and Pensions and was the Conservative leader from September 2001 to November 2003.

Parliamentary Elections

1987 General Election, Bradford West

1992 General Election, Chingford

1997 General Election, Chingford and Woodford Green

2001 General Election, Chingford and Woodford Green

2005 General Election, Chingford and Woodford Green

2010 General Election, Chingford and Woodford Green

None of the Above (Independent) Original name Adam Osen.

2015 General Election, Chingford and Woodford Green

2017 General Election, Chingford and Woodford Green

2001 Conservative Party leadership election

References

Smith, Ian Duncan
Duncan Smith, Iain